The University of Puthisastra (UP) is a private university in Phnom Penh, Cambodia. UP was recognised by the Royal Government of Cambodia under a sub-decree signed by Prime Minister Hun Sen on 15 November 2007. UP has also been awarded full accreditation, for its Foundation Year Course, by the Accreditation Committee of Cambodia (ACC).

With more than a decade of excellence in the field of health science and technology, UP trains doctors, dentists, pharmacists, nurses, midwives, laboratory technicians, computer scientists and technology entrepreneurs. There are eight departments at UP that are involved in the health sciences and science and technology including Medicine, Dentistry, Pharmacy, Nursing, Midwifery, Medical Laboratory, and Information and Communication Technologies and a Center for Health Counselling.

Notes

References

External links

Universities in Cambodia
Education in Phnom Penh
Educational institutions established in 2007
2007 establishments in Cambodia